Heinke may refer to:

 Heinke (diving equipment manufacturer) (1818–1869), a 19th-century British manufacturer of diving equipment
 George H. Heinke (1882–1940), Nebraska Republican politician
 Harald Heinke (born 1955), German Olympic judoka
 Sarah Heinke, American voice actress; see Strawberry Shortcake: Rockaberry Roll
 Heinke van der Merwe (born 1985, Johannesburg), professional South African rugby player

See also 
 Heincke

Dutch masculine given names
Low German surnames
Surnames from given names